The Fonău is a left tributary of the Valea Nouă in Romania. It flows into the Valea Nouă in Husasău de Tinca.

References

Rivers of Romania
Rivers of Bihor County